The province of Medio Campidano was a province in the autonomous region of Sardinia, Italy. It had two chief towns, Villacidro and Sanluri, with 14,245 and 8,543 inhabitants, respectively. It was established in 2005 from a section of the province of Cagliari. It contained 28 comuni (singular: comune) and the president of the province was Fulvio Tocco.

The province contained Nuragic archaeological site Su Nuraxi in Barumini (now under the Province of South Sardinia), which was included in the UNESCO list of World Heritage Sites in 1997.

Medio Campidano was suppressed as a province by the 2016 Regional Decree Province of South Sardinia

History

The formation of the province was announced in 2001 by the Autonomous Region of Sardinia and it officially became a province in May 2005 from a section of the province of Cagliari. On 6 May 2012 the regional referendums of Sardinia took place regarding the abolition of certain provinces and a variety of other matters. The suggestion of reforming or abolishing certain provinces in Sardinia was approved by the Regional Council of Sardinia on 24 May 2012. Due to this, the province of Medio Campidano was ordered to form a new administrative body or be abolished on 1 March 2013, but this expiry date for constitutional changes was extended to 1 July 2013. It later formed a new administrative body.

Geography
The Province of Medio Campidano is on the west side of the Island of Sardinia, with a coastline on the Mediterranean Sea. To the north is the Province of Oristano, to the east the Province of Cagliari and to the south, the Provinces of Carbonia-Iglesias and Cagliari. It is divided into 28 municipalities. The capitals are Sanluri in the east and Villacidro in the south. The environment is diverse, with mountains, hills, plains and coastline. The province is one of the least populated and most unspoilt areas of the island and has earned the name, the "Green Province".

The mining industry began to develop in the province in the nineteenth century due to the large lead, copper and silver reserves, but the industry became uneconomical after World War II and all that now remains is the industrial heritage. In the more hilly districts, olives and grapes are grown and Sardinia is known for the breeding of sheep. The Campidano plain is used for cropping and produces rice, maize and sorghum.

Government

List of presidents of the province of Medio Campidano

References

External links

 
Medio